Pearland is a city in the U.S. state of Texas, within Brazoria County, with portions extending into Fort Bend and Harris counties. The city of Pearland is a principal city within the  metropolitan statistical area. At the 2020 U.S. census, the city's population was 125,828, up from a population of 91,252 at the 2010 census. Pearland's population growth rate from 2000 to 2010 was 142 percent, which ranked Pearland as the 15th-fastest-growing city in the U.S. during that time period, compared to other cities with a population of 10,000 or greater in 2000. Pearland is the third-largest city in the Greater Houston area, and from 2000 to 2010, ranked as the fastest-growing city in Greater Houston and the second-fastest-growing city in Texas. Per the American Community Survey of 2019 the population had risen to an estimated 131,448.

History
Pearland had its beginnings near a siding switch on the Gulf, Colorado and Santa Fe Railway in 1882. When a post office was established in 1893, the community was named "Mark Belt". On September 24, 1894, the plat of "Pear-Land" was filed with the Brazoria County courthouse by Witold von Zychlinski, a man of Polish nobility. At the time Pearland had many fruits harvested by residents. Zychlinski saw the pear trees and decided that "Pearland" would make a good name for the community.

In the 1800s, Pearland consisted of prairie. Residents harvested fruit and vegetables such as cantaloupes, corn, figs, pears and watermelons. Pearland was promoted by developers Allison & Richey Land Company as an "agricultural Eden". The first subdivision was called "Suburban Gardens".

The Galveston hurricane of 1900 and the Galveston hurricane of 1915 destroyed most of the city's fruit trees and slowed growth for a considerable period of time, and caused a period of desertification in the area. In 1914, with agriculture rebounding and the end of desertification, Pearland had a population of 400, but a devastating freeze in 1918 was another setback to the local farming enterprises. Oil was discovered nearby in 1934, which led to the development of the Hastings Oilfield, though it did not spur much growth, as the population fluctuated between 150 and 350. In the 1930s and 1940s, Pearland had many dance halls and beer joints that entertained people from the Hastings and Manvel oil fields.

From the 1970s, the town has grown to its present-day population. By 1990, the city limits had extended into Harris County. In the 1990s, home developers began buying large tracts of land, changing the geography of the city. Former rice fields filled with houses. The historic town center of Pearland is at the intersection of Texas State Highway 35/Main and Broadway. West Pearland has a lot of suburban development, while East Pearland has older houses and, according to Maggie Galehouse of the Houston Chronicle, Pearland's "rural roots still show" in the east side. Pearland's main east-west corridor is Farm to Market Road 518/Broadway.

Geography
Pearland is within northern Brazoria County at  (29.554349, −95.295959), south of the city of Houston. Portions of the city extend north into Harris County, and a smaller portion extends west into Fort Bend County. The city is bordered by Houston and Brookside Village to the north, by Manvel to the south, Almeda Rd/FM 521 to the west and by Friendswood to the east.

Neighborhoods
Eighty-three percent of Pearland is residential, which is a major contributing factor to the high population. The city is home to many master-planned communities; Sunrise Lakes, Southern Trails, Southdown, Lakes of Highland Glen, and Shadow Creek Ranch are among the most popular master-planned communities in Brazoria County. Country Place and Silverlake are in unincorporated areas near Pearland.

Demographics

At the 2010 United States census, the city's population was 91,252, a 142% increase over the 2000 population of 37,640. Pearland's government stated in 2009 that the estimated population in the city limits was 91,000, and that city population and the population of nearby unincorporated areas, including Country Place and Silverlake, was 125,000 altogether. At the American Community Survey's 2019 population estimates, the city of Pearland's population increased to 122,460, up 31,208 residents since the 2010 U.S. census. At another population estimates program in 2019 by the U.S. Census Bureau, the population increased to 131,448. As of the 2020 United States census, there were 125,828 people, 42,098 households, and 32,177 families residing in the city.

At the census of 2000, there had been 37,640 people, 13,192 households, and 10,659 families residing in the city. The population density was 957.0 people per square mile (369.5/km). There were 13,922 housing units at an average density of 354.0 per square mile (136.7/km). The median income for a household in the city as of 2000 was $64,156, and the median income for a family was $70,748 (these figures had risen to $83,706 and $92,096 respectively as of a 2007 estimate). Males had a median income of $49,359 versus $34,570 for females. The per capita income for the city was $26,306. About 3.4% of families and 4.7% of the population were below the poverty line, including 6.1% of those under age 18 and 3.5% of those age 65 or over.

The U.S. Census Bureau's 2019 estimates determined Pearland had 41,507 households with an average of 2.93 persons per household. Residents of Pearland had an owner-occupied housing rate of 75.9%. The median value of owner-occupied housing units was $244,800 and the median gross rent was $1,413. The median household income from 2015-2019 was $104,504 and the per capita income was $42,211. Roughly 3.5% of the local population lived at or below the poverty line. The population density as of 2010 was 1,940.9 people per square mile.

Race and ethnicity 

The racial makeup of the city as of the 2010 census was 62.0% White, 16.4% African American, 0.5% Native American, 12.4% Asian, 0.04% Pacific Islander, 6.0% from some other race, and 2.7% two or more races. The Hispanic or Latino population, including persons of any race, was 20.5% of the total population, and non-Hispanic whites made up 48.8%. In 2019, 39.0% of Pearland was non-Hispanic white, 14.7% Black or African American, 1.2% American Indian or Alaska Native, 15.0% Asian, 0.9% multiracial, and 29.3% Hispanic or Latino of any race. The racial makeup of the city in 2000 was 82.6% White, 5.3% African American, 0.4% Native American, 3.6% Asian, 0.04% Pacific Islander, 6.1% "some other race", and 1.8% "two or more races". Hispanic or Latino of any race were 16.2% of the population. By 2010, the city became ethnically and racially majority minority. At least 62 languages are spoken in Pearland public schools.

Religion 

Nearly 60% of the local population claim religious affiliation as of 2020. Christianity is the largest religion in Pearland and the surrounding Greater Houston metropolitan area. Baptists formed the largest Christian group followed by the Catholic Church then the United Methodist Church. Large non-Christian religious groups included Islam, Judaism, and eastern religions including Hinduism and Buddhism.

St. Helen Catholic Church of the Roman Catholic Archdiocese of Galveston-Houston was established in 1966. Its previous church building had a capacity of 900, it was building a new sanctuary, with a capacity of 15,000 and a cost of $7 million. The expansion plans also added parking spaces and installed a bridal facility. The sanctuary construction was to begin fall 2002 and parking construction was to begin summer 2002. In 2002, 4,000 families were members, and in 2016 this had increased to 6,000, making it the largest Catholic church in Brazoria County. The property includes a K–8 school, St. Helen Catholic School. There is another Catholic parish with property in the Pearland city limits; St. Luke the Evangelist Church maintains the Cenacle Learning Center (CLC) in Pearland, while the main campus is in an unincorporated area in Harris County.

New Harvest Christian Fellowship, a non-denominational church established in 1999 with 60 members, was established by Keith Anderson. It first held services at Challenger Elementary School before moving into a 100-seat,  worship center. On April 7, 2019 it was to convert the previous sanctuary into a youth ministry building and to open a new sanctuary. It is affiliated with the Southern Baptist Convention.

Shadycrest Baptist Church's previous sanctuary had a capacity of around 270–275. By 2011 it was having a new  sanctuary built. The expected cost was $4,700,000.

New Hope Church, an independent Christian church, started in Pearland in 1989 with 100 in attendance. As of 2022, the church had grown to five campuses with over 10,000 worshippers.

Chabad Pearland Jewish Center is the first Jewish center of worship in Pearland, established by Yossi and Esty Zaklikofsky in 2009. In addition to Pearland, it also serves Alvin and Friendswood.

The Sri Meenakshi Temple in Pearland had its property purchased in 1978 and was established in 1979. Pat Turner of the Houston Chronicle wrote that the initial facility "was barely big enough for one person to stand in while performing worship services (pooja)." New facilities were established circa 1995. From its founding in 1979 to the opening of the Chabad Pearland Jewish Center in 2009, it was the only non-Christian place of worship in Pearland.

Rewake Inc., an independent Christian group, was founded in 2016 and chaired by Pastor Phil Brown. The group conducted services at the Bakfish Brewing Co. brewery in Pearland. Dana Burke of the Bay Area Citizen described it as non-traditional.

It began construction December 2010 with an anticipated completion time of May 2011. It opened c. 2012. By 2016, the leadership was considering expanding the mosque, with June 2016 being the scheduled month of the start of construction. The mosque is on a  site.

Economy

Workforce and industry

Pearland's labor force and job base grew substantially with its population growth. The number of jobs in the community grew from 9,169 in 2000 to 17,552 in 2008. The total labor force that resides in the community increased from approximately 20,000 in 2000 to 45,368 in 2010. A majority of the community's labor force commutes daily into the Texas Medical Center and other employment centers in the region. Pearland also has many people employed by NASA at the Lyndon B. Johnson Space Center.

Pearland's economy in the 2010's has helped increase it's healthcare and health-related workforce. Kelsey-Seybold Clinic's new  administrative office building in Shadow Creek Ranch was expected to open in the fall of 2013, with 800 employees. This follows two other medical manufacturing facilities: Cardiovascular Systems, which opened in 2010, and Merit Medical Systems, which began construction in 2011. The Merit project, provides facilities for 220 research and development employees. By 2020, 50% of the city's economy relies on healthcare equipment manufacturing or medical research.

Other employers are a reflection of Pearland's suburban economy, with the vast majority of it retail.

According to a 2020 Comprehensive Financial Report, the top employers in Pearland were:

Retail and entertainment
Pearland was one of two Texas cities to average double-digit growth in retail sales from 2004 to 2009, and its retail market was the state's fastest growing over the five-year periods ending 2009, 2010, and 2011. Prominent mixed-use lifestyle and shopping complexes service residents with national retailers and dining establishments.
 Pearland Town Center –  lifestyle center. Opened in July 2008. Includes Macy's, Dillard's, Dick's Sporting Goods, and Barnes and Noble. Restaurants include BJ's Restaurant and Brewhouse, La Madeleine, and Gringos Mexican Kitchen.
 Shadow Creek Town Center –  retail and dining center. Retail stores include HEB Plus, Academy Sports + Outdoors, Hobby Lobby, and Ashley Furniture.
 The Spectrum District – Existing developments include Bass Pro Shops. Proposed developments include urban residential, office, and retail projects.
 Silverlake Village Shopping Center – Silverlake Village is anchored by Super Target, and features a host of other national retailers including Michael's, Marshalls, PetSmart, Ross, DSW, Office Depot and Randalls. Sam's Boat, Saltgrass Steakhouse, Chili's, and Dimassi's as some of the restaurants located here.
 The Crossing @ 288 – Best Buy, JCPenney, Old Navy, Bed Bath and Beyond, Half Price Books and other stores and restaurants such as Olive Garden and Chipotle.
 Shadow Creek Market Place – Kroger Signature store, Cracker Barrel, Bank of America, Chase Bank and other stores.

Healthcare

 Memorial Hermann Pearland
 Pearland Medical Center
 Reserve at SCR – Kelsey-Seybold, Memorial Herman and HCA
 St. Luke's Emergency Center
 Texas Children's Pediatrics – Pearland's first free charity clinic named SEVA Clinic. The nonprofit serves as a walk-in clinic for primary care cases, such as diabetes, hypertension and other non-emergency cases. SEVA Clinic is housed inside the facilities of another local nonprofit serving the city named the Pearland Neighborhood Center and is located at 2335 N. Texas Avenue Pearland, TX 77581.

Since 2015, "Wobble before you Gobble", Pearland's largest Annual Health Fair is hosted by the local community. Founded by a local Primary care Physician Dr Vishalakshmi Batchu, this health fair happens around the second or third week of November at Pearland Town Center. The event showcases several big and small healthcare facilities. Free health checkups, screenings, vaccinations, procedures, nutrition, lifestyle, are offered at the fair. Various fine arts clubs from local schools participate in the fair and showcase their talent in forms of singing, dancing, workouts, skits and exercises. Several workout specialists offer workout sessions including zumba, salsa, bollywood, yoga and many more formats. The event is grassroots in nature, which means, it is organized by residents of Pearland.

Government and infrastructure

Elected city officials include:

Mayor, Kevin Cole

 Mayor Pro Tem, Tony Carbone
 Councilmember, Position 1: Joseph Koza, Jr.
 Councilmember, Position 3: Alex Kamkar
 Councilmember, Position 4: Adrian Hernandez
 Councilmember, Position 5: Layni Cade
 Councilmember, Position 6: Jeffrey Barry
 Councilmember, Position 7: Woody Owens

The city is represented in the Congress in the 22nd District by Republican Troy Nehls, elected in 2020.

The United States Postal Service operates the Pearland Post Office at 3519 East Walnut Street and the Ofc. Endy Ekpanya Post Office at 2700 Cullen Boulevard.

Harris Health System (formerly Harris County Hospital District) designated Strawberry Health Center in Pasadena for ZIP code 77089 (Harris County Pearland). The nearest public hospital is Ben Taub General Hospital in the Texas Medical Center. Fort Bend County does not have a hospital district. OakBend Medical Center serves as the county's charity hospital which the county contracts with.

Education

Primary and secondary schools

Public

Most of Pearland is a part of the Pearland Independent School District. Other portions of Pearland are part of Alvin Independent School District (including most of Shadow Creek Ranch), Fort Bend Independent School District (including some of Shadow Creek Ranch), Clear Creek Independent School District, Houston Independent School District, and Pasadena Independent School District.
 All schools in Pearland ISD, including Pearland High School and  Glenda Dawson High School, serve the Pearland ISD portion of Pearland.
 The Alvin ISD portion is served by several elementary and middle schools as well as Shadow Creek High School (in Pearland) and Manvel High School (in Manvel).
 Most of the Fort Bend ISD portion is zoned to schools in Houston: Blue Ridge Elementary School, McAuliffe Middle School, and Willowridge High School. A small area is zoned to schools in Missouri City: Parks Elementary School, Lake Olympia Middle School, and Hightower High School.
 South Belt Elementary School of Pasadena ISD is in the Pearland city limits. Some of the Pasadena ISD portion is served by Moore Elementary School and the rest is served by South Belt Elementary School. One part is served by Morris Middle School and Beverly Hills Intermediate while the other is served by Melillo Middle School and Thompson Intermediate School. All Pasadena ISD residents in Pearland are zoned to Dobie High School (in Houston).
 The Clear Creek ISD portion is served by Weber Elementary School, Westbrook Intermediate School, and Clear Brook High School, all in unincorporated Harris County).
 The Houston ISD portion is served by Almeda Elementary School, Lawson Middle School (formerly Dowling Middle School), and Worthing High School (all in Houston).

Private

St. Helen Catholic School, a K–8 Roman Catholic School operated by the Roman Catholic Archdiocese of Galveston-Houston.
 Located on the grounds of St. Helen Catholic Church, it previously had  of space, but by 2019 its space increased to  due to an expansion.  it had 400 students.
 The Eagle Heights Christian Academy is operated by the First Baptist Church and is located in Pearland on Pearland Parkway. It offers grades Pre-K–12.
 Heritage Christian Academy is located in Pearland. First Christian Academy Pre-K–12th grade.
 The Montessori School of Downtown is also an option for children Infant through 5th grade, with two locations in Pearland.

 Awty International School in Spring Branch, which includes the Houston area's French international school, provides bus services for students to and from Pearland, as does Saint Thomas' Episcopal School near Meyerland, and Saint Thomas High School in central Houston.

Colleges and universities
The Pearland ISD and Alvin ISD portions are served by Alvin Community College (ACC); the Alvin ISD part is in ACC's taxation boundary.

The Pasadena ISD portion is served by San Jacinto College, and the Houston ISD and Fort Bend ISD parts are served by Houston Community College (HCC).

The University of Houston–Clear Lake (UHCL) has a satellite campus located within the city.

Public libraries
The Pearland Library at 3522 Liberty Drive is a part of the Brazoria County Library System. As of September 13, 2008 the library was closed for many months due to Hurricane Ike storm damage. It reopened in March 2009.

Transportation

Metro Park and Ride
On December 5, 2011, The Metropolitan Transit Authority of Harris County purchased  of land near Hwy. 288 and FM 518 in the Pearland area for a future "Park and Ride" facility. Alan Parker Properties LP represented the seller, Carolyn and Frank Wenglar, in the $3.95 million land sale. Metro, which currently operates 29 Park and Rides throughout Harris County, said that the new facility will give Brazoria County residents another option for traveling to the Texas Medical Center and other downtown Houston destinations. The new facility was scheduled to begin operations in the fall of 2013, but property was given to the city in a cash swap. The city is exploring a private run service or other uses for the property.

Airports
Two privately owned airports, Pearland Regional Airport and Skyway Manor Airport, are in the city limits. Both airports allow public use. The land with Pearland Regional Airport was annexed into the Pearland city limits in 2017.

The closest publicly owned airport is the Brazoria County Airport, located in an unincorporated area.

Commercial airline service is provided out of Houston from William P. Hobby Airport and George Bush Intercontinental Airport, both in Houston.

Freeway system
Pearland is served by State Highway 288 which connects the city to Houston. FM 518, locally known as Broadway, is the main east-west artery of the city. State Highway 35, locally called Main Street and known as Telephone Road, is the main north-south artery of the city. Given the spread out area, SH 288 serves the westernmost part of the city, while SH 35 serves the easternmost part as both connect Pearland to Houston (FM 865/Cullen Blvd also connects Houston as well in between).
The Texas State Highway Beltway 8 (Sam Houston Tollway) services the northern part of Pearland. It is located adjacent to the northern Brazoria County and southeastern Harris County border. It also serves as one of the largest tollways in the Houston area.

Notable people

 Joseph Gutheinz, retired NASA employee who investigated stolen and missing moon rocks
 The 1980s punk and new wave band The Judy's
 Clay Hensley, Major League Baseball pitcher born, raised, and now resided in Pearland
 Kyle Kacal, member of the Texas House of Representatives from College Station since 2013; rancher in Brazos County
 Richard Machowicz, television personality and former Navy Seal
 Bunny Meyer, YouTube personality
 Thomas Morstead, New Orleans Saints punter
 Normani, singer and former member of Fifth Harmony who moved to Pearland from New Orleans after Hurricane Katrina
 Megan Thee Stallion, rapper
 Randy Weber, member of the United States Congress who was born in Pearland and resided there till 2012
 Fozzy Whittaker, retired NFL running back
 Connor Wong, MLB player for the Boston Red Sox
 Alyah Chanelle Scott, actress

Sister cities

 Markham, Ontario, Canada
 Matamoros, Tamaulipas, Mexico
 Lopez, Quezon, Philippines
 Palencia, Spain

References

External links

 City of Pearland official website
 Pearland Economic Development Corporation
 Pearland Chamber of Commerce
 Pearland Convention and Visitors Bureau
 
 Pearland Journal

 
Cities in Brazoria County, Texas
Cities in Harris County, Texas
Cities in Fort Bend County, Texas
Cities in Texas
Greater Houston